Hidalgo is one of the 38 municipalities of Coahuila, in north-eastern Mexico. The municipal seat lies at Hidalgo. The municipality covers an area of 1619.8 km² and is located on the international border between Mexico and the USA, there formed by the Río Bravo del Norte (Rio Grande), adjacent to the U.S. state of Texas.

As of 2010, the municipality had a total population of 1,852.

Towns and villages

The largest localities (cities, towns, and villages) are:

Adjacent municipalities and counties

 Anáhuac Municipality, Nuevo León - southeast and south
 Juárez Municipality - south
 Villa Unión Municipality - west
 Guerrero Municipality - northwest
 Webb County, Texas - northeast

References

Municipalities of Coahuila